Alice is a 1990 American fantasy romantic comedy film written and directed by Woody Allen and starring Mia Farrow, Joe Mantegna, and William Hurt. The film is a loose reworking of Federico Fellini's 1965 film Juliet of the Spirits.

Alice received mildly positive reviews.

Plot
Alice Tate is an upper-class Manhattan housewife who spends her days shopping, getting beauty treatments, and gossiping with her friends. She has been married to wealthy Doug for sixteen years, and they have two children, who are being raised by a nanny.

One day, she has a brief encounter with Joe Ruffalo, a handsome jazz musician. She finds herself mysteriously attracted to him and experiences Catholic guilt for these feelings. This inner turmoil manifests itself in a backache. She is referred to Dr. Yang, an Asian herbalist who puts her under hypnosis. She reveals that what initially attracted her to her husband were in fact his superficial qualities: looks and money. She also reveals her feelings about Joe.

Dr. Yang gives Alice ancient herbs that make her act on her feelings toward Joe Ruffalo. They agree to meet. When the herbs wear off, Alice is appalled at her behavior. She does not go to meet him as planned. The next herbs she receives turn her invisible. She spies on Joe going to visit his ex-wife Vicki. Much to prudish Alice's horror, they have sex in Vicki's office. Alice is now glad she did not go to meet Joe. However, the next herbal remedy allows Alice to communicate with the ghost of her first lover, Ed, who encourages her to discover more about Joe. Alice and Joe finally meet, under the pretense of their children having a "play-date". Alice and Joe's meetings become increasingly frequent.

When her guilt over her relationship with Joe becomes too much, Alice returns to Dr. Yang. Inhaling the soothing contents of a pipe, Alice falls asleep in Dr. Yang's rooms. She has vivid dreams about her Catholic upbringing. She remembers her mother. She remembers that she was at her happiest when she was helping people. She realizes that she has lost sight of many of her goals in her materialistic luxurious lifestyle. She also realizes this at a fundraising evening in honor of Mother Teresa, one of Alice's idols. After the fundraiser, Joe and Alice sleep together. Alice realizes she is falling in love with him.

Alice shares the remaining invisibility herbs with Joe. She hears two of her friends gossiping about her and Joe. The gossip then moves onto Doug, where it is revealed that he has been having affairs, too. Invisible, Alice goes to his office party, where she sees Doug kissing a colleague. Her invisibility wears off and she confronts Doug about his affairs. Alice decides to leave Doug once and for all. She tells this to Joe. However, Joe has decided to reunite with his ex-wife after he spied on her therapy sessions when invisible and realized she still has feelings for him.

Stunned, Alice goes to Dr. Yang, who is leaving town. He gives her one final packet of herbs, telling her that these will create a potent love potion. Alice must choose between Joe and Doug. She goes to her sister Dorothy for advice. However, Dorothy is having a Christmas party, and the herbs get mixed in with the eggnog. All the men in the party become enamored with Alice. She flees in panic.

At home, Alice tells Doug that their marriage is over. She reveals her plans to go to Calcutta and work with Mother Teresa. Doug scoffs at this, doubting that Alice could survive without the luxuries she has grown accustomed to. However, Doug is proved wrong. Alice goes to Calcutta, where she meets Mother Teresa. Upon returning to New York, she moves into a modest apartment, raises the children on her own, and does volunteer work in her spare time.

Cast

Production
Allen came up with the idea for the film after having alternative treatment for a stye in his eye. The original title was The Magical Herbs of Dr. Yang, and it was filmed in late 1989. It was a difficult shoot, with Farrow raising her young children while filming and Allen obsessing over details, and some scenes were reshot until he was satisfied. Allen later checked into hospital by the end of the shoot, brought on by stress.

This was Keye Luke's final film, as he died nearly three weeks after the film's release.

Soundtrack

Limehouse Blues (1921) - Written by Philip Braham & Douglas Furber - Performed by Jackie Gleason
Breezin' Along with the Breeze(1926) - Written by Dizzy Gillespie, Seymour Simons & Richard A. Whiting - Performed by Jackie Gleason
I Dream Too Much (1935) - Written by Dorothy Fields & Jerome Kern - Performed by Paul Weston and His Orchestra
Moonglow (1933) - Music by Will Hudson & Irving Mills - Lyrics by Edgar De Lange - Performed by Artie Shaw and His Orchestra
La Cumparsita (1916) - Written by Gerardo Matos Rodríguez - Performed by The Castilians
The Courier - Written by Linda Hudes - Performed by The Big Apple Circus Band
World Music - Written by Linda Hudes - Performed by The Big Apple Circus Band
Caravan (1937) - Written by Duke Ellington, Irving Mills & Juan Tizol - Performed by Erroll Garner
I Remember You (1942) - Written by Johnny Mercer & Victor Schertzinger - Performed by Jackie Gleason
Moonlight Becomes You (1942) - Written by Jimmy Van Heusen & Johnny Burke - Performed by Jackie Gleason
The Way You Look Tonight (1936) - Written by Dorothy Fields & Jerome Kern - Performed by Erroll Garner
Alice Blue Gown(1919) - Written by Joseph McCarthy and Harry Tierney - Performed by Wayne King & His Orchestra
Concerto No 1 In A Minor for Violin and Orchestra, BWV 1041(1717) - Written by Johann Sebastian Bach - Performed & Conducted by Pinchas Zukerman
Darn That Dream (1939) - Written by Edgar De Lange & Jimmy Van Heusen - Performed by Thelonious Monk
Southern Comfort (1949) - Written by Danny Alguire, Frank Thomas & Ward Kimball - Performed by Firehouse Five Plus Two
Mack the Knife (1928) - Written by Kurt Weill & Marc Blitzstein & Bertolt Brecht
Flight of the Foo Birds (1957) - Written by Neal Hefti - Performed by Count Basie
Will You Still Be Mine (1941) - Written by Matt Dennis & Tom Adair (as Thomas M. Adair) - Performed by Erroll Garner
O Tannenbaum - Traditional tune - Performed by Liberace
We Wish You a Merry Christmas - Traditional tune - Performed by Liberace

Release

Box office
Alice was a disappointment at the North American box office; the film grossed a domestic total of $7,331,647 on an estimated $12 million budget.

Critical reception
In his review in The New York Times, Vincent Canby wrote: "Alice is about one woman's tempest-tossed, giddy, herb-induced voyage of self-discovery. It is north-of-the-border magical realism—Alice flies, she becomes invisible, she is another person. It is hilarious and romantic, serious and exuberantly satiric."

Accolades

References

External links
 
 
 
 
 

1990 films
1990 independent films
1990 romantic comedy films
1990s Christmas comedy films
1990s English-language films
1990s fantasy comedy films
1990s romantic fantasy films
Adultery in films
American Christmas comedy films
American fantasy comedy films
American independent films
American romantic comedy films
American romantic fantasy films
Films about dysfunctional families
Films about invisibility
Films about the upper class
Films directed by Woody Allen
Films produced by Robert Greenhut
Films set in Manhattan
Films shot in New York City
Films with screenplays by Woody Allen
Magic realism films
Midlife crisis films
Orion Pictures films
1990s American films